Elzinga is a Dutch surname from the provinces of Friesland and Groningen. Originally meaning from the "house of Elso/Elze", it was in 1811, when surnames needed to be adopted by those families still using patronyms, adopted as a metonymic occupational surname, referring to the els (awl), used by shoemakers. Variant forms are Elsinga and Elzenga. People with this surname include:

Aant Elzinga (born 1937), Dutch-born science politics and history scholar
Kenneth G. Elzinga (born 1941), American economist and crime fiction writer
Peter Elzinga (born 1944), Canadian (Alberta) politician
Peter Elzinga (archer) (born 1981), Dutch archer

References

Dutch-language surnames
Occupational surnames